Stan Kenton / Jean Turner (full title From the Creative World of Stan Kenton Comes the Exciting New Voice of Jean Turner) is an album by the Stan Kenton Orchestra with vocalist Jean Turner recorded in 1963 by Capitol Records.

Reception

The Allmusic site gave the album 3 stars.

Track listing
 "A Lot of Livin' to Do" (Charles Strouse, Lee Adams) – 2:04
 "Oh! You Crazy Moon" (Jimmy Van Heusen, Johnny Burke) – 2:31
 "Sleepy Lagoon" (Eric Coates, Jack Lawrence) – 2:12
 "Love Is Here to Stay" (George Gershwin, Ira Gershwin) – 2:41
 "Piel Canela" (Bobby Capó) – 2:26
 "It's a Big Wide Wonderful World!" (John Rox) – 1:38
 "Someone to Watch Over Me" (G. Gershwin, I. Gershwin) – 2:36
 "Love Walked In" (G. Gershwin, I. Gershwin) – 2:35
 "Day Dream" (Billy Strayhorn, Duke Ellington, John La Touche) – 3:42
 "Quizás, Quizás, Quizás" (Osvaldo Farrés, Joe Davis) – 2:45
 "You're the Top" (Cole Porter) – 2:36
Recorded at Capitol Studios in Hollywood, CA on September 11, 1963 (tracks 1, 5–7 & 9–11) and September 12, 1963 (tracks 2–4 & 8).

Personnel
Stan Kenton – piano, arranger, conductor
Jean Turner – vocals
Bob Behrendt, Ron Keller, Buzzy Mills, Ronnie Ossa, Tommy Porrello – trumpet
Edwin "Buddy" Baker, Bob Curnow, Jiggs Whigham – trombone
Jim Amlotte – bass trombone
Dave Wheeler – bass trombone, tuba
Bob Crull, Robert Fause, David Horton, Tony Scodwell – mellophone
Gabe Baltazar – alto saxophone
Ray Florian, Steve Marcus – tenor saxophone
Dale Norris – baritone saxophone
Joel Kaye – baritone saxophone, bass saxophone, alto flute
John Worster – bass 
Dee Barton – drums 
Frank Carlson – bongos (tracks 1, 5, 6, 10 & 11)
Bill Holman (tracks 1 & 6), Lennie Niehaus (tracks 3–5 & 7–11) – arranger

References

Stan Kenton albums
1964 albums
Capitol Records albums
Albums conducted by Stan Kenton
Albums recorded at Capitol Studios
Collaborative albums
Albums produced by Lee Gillette